The Alford Valley Railway is a  narrow gauge railway in the Howe of Alford, Aberdeenshire, Scotland. It is located at what used to be the terminus of the passenger and goods Alford Valley Railway which connected with the Great North of Scotland Railway main line at Kintore.

Original railway

The construction of the Alford Valley Railway started in 1856 and the line opened in 1859 as a Great North of Scotland Railway (GNSR) branch line from Kintore railway station, northwest of Aberdeen, with stations at Kemnay, Monymusk, Tillyfourie, Whitehouse and Alford. The line also served Kemnay Quarry and three other granite quarries in the area. The train took just over an hour for the  journey. Until 1883, by law the third class fare on one train a day could not be more than a penny per mile.

In 1923 GNSR was incorporated into the London and North Eastern Railway and, in 1948, became part of the Scottish Region of British Railways. The line closed to passengers on 31 December 1949, when driver Mr James Tocher drove the last passenger train into Alford Station. The goods service closed exactly sixteen years later on 31 December 1965, when the last train was driven by Mr Robert Asher, and attended by Mr James Elder, guard, both Aberdeen, and Mr Walter Mearns, fireman, Inverurie.

Narrow gauge railway
The narrow gauge railway, built from salvaged equipment from the New Pitsligo peat moss railway, was proposed in 1979 and opened in 1980. However, the original Murray Woods line was then closed.

The current station building is on the site of the original granite structure which was demolished after British Rail closed the line.  The passenger platform is the original. A small railway museum is housed in the railway station building. The original locomotive shed was situated to the east of the station but this has also now been demolished. To the west of the station the granite carriage shed of the previous railway is now used by the Alford Valley Railway.  The Grampian Transport Museum and Alford Heritage Museum are nearby.

The railway closed in 2017. A new group, the Alford Valley Community Railway, was subsequently formed with the intention of reopening the line.

References

External links 
Grampian Transport Museum
British Railways in 1960: Kintore Jn. to Alford

Heritage railways in Scotland
Transport in Aberdeenshire
2 ft gauge railways in Scotland
Railway museums in Scotland
Railway lines opened in 1859
Railway lines opened in 1980
Museums in Aberdeenshire
Standard gauge railways in Scotland
1859 establishments in Scotland